Yashiki (written: 屋敷 lit. "residence" or 家鋪) is a Japanese surname. Notable people with the surname include:

, Japanese musician
, Japanese shogi player
, better known as Takajin, Japanese singer and television personality

Japanese-language surnames